The 35th Golden Globe Awards, honoring the best in film and television for 1977, were held on January 28, 1978.

Winners and nominees

Film

Television

Best Series - Drama
 Roots
Charlie's Angels
Columbo 
Family
Starsky and Hutch
Upstairs, Downstairs

Best Series - Comedy or Musical
 All in the Family
Barney Miller
The Carol Burnett Show
Happy Days
Laverne & Shirley

Best Television Film
 Raid on Entebbe
Just a Little Inconvenience
Mary Jane Harper Cried Last Night
Mary White
Something for Joey

Best Actor - Drama Series Edward Asner - Lou GrantRobert Conrad - Baa Baa Black Sheep
Peter Falk - Columbo
James Garner - The Rockford Files
Telly Savalas - Kojak

Best Actress - Drama Series Lesley Ann Warren - 79 Park AvenueAngie Dickinson - Police Woman
Kate Jackson - Charlie's Angels
Leslie Uggams - Roots
Lindsay Wagner - The Bionic Woman

Best Actor - Comedy or Musical Series Henry Winkler - Happy DaysAlan Alda - M*A*S*H
Ron Howard - Happy Days
Hal Linden - Barney Miller
Carroll O'Connor - All in the Family

Best Actress - Comedy or Musical Series Carol Burnett - The Carol Burnett Show'Beatrice Arthur - MaudePenny Marshall - Laverne & ShirleyIsabel Sanford - The JeffersonsJean Stapleton - All in the FamilyCindy Williams - Laverne & Shirley''

See also
50th Academy Awards
29th Primetime Emmy Awards
30th Primetime Emmy Awards
 31st British Academy Film Awards
 32nd Tony Awards
 1977 in film
 1977 in television

References
IMdb 1978 Golden Globe Awards

035
1977 film awards
1977 television awards
January 1978 events in the United States
Golden Globe